The Roman Catholic Diocese of Tubarão is a diocese located in the city of Tubarão in the Ecclesiastical province of Florianópolis in Brazil.

History
 December 28, 1954: Established as Diocese of Tubarão from the Metropolitan Archdiocese of Florianópolis

Leadership
 Bishops of Tubarão (Roman rite)
Anselmo Pietrulla, O.F.M. (1955–1981)
Osório Bebber, O.F.M. Cap. (17 September 1981 – 1992), appointed Prelate of Coxim, Mato Grosso do Sul
Hilário Moser, S.D.B. (1992–2004)
Jacinto Bergmann (2004–2009), appointed Bishop of Pelotas, Rio Grande do Sul
Wilson Tadeu Jönck, S.C.I. (18 July 2010 – 2011), appointed Archbishop of Florianópolis, Santa Catarina
João Francisco Salm (24 November 2012–present)

References

External links
 Diocese website (Portuguese) 
 GCatholic.org
 Catholic Hierarchy

Roman Catholic dioceses in Brazil
Christian organizations established in 1954
Tubarao, Roman Catholic Diocese of
Roman Catholic dioceses and prelatures established in the 20th century
1954 establishments in Brazil